Holly Hobbie & Friends is a series of animated specials produced by Nickelodeon and American Greetings. It is the first series to star the Holly Hobbie doll, albeit redesigned from her traditional look. The specials aired on both Nickelodeon's Nick Jr. block and the separate Noggin channel. Country singer LeAnn Rimes sang the theme song.

In this incarnation of Holly Hobbie, Holly is a ten-year-old girl who forms a secret club (called the Hey Girls) with her two best friends, Amy and Carrie. Holly is the great, great granddaughter of the original Holly Hobbie character. According to American Greetings, the intention was for Holly to "look pretty much the same, but with new, contemporary colors and patterns."

The first special, "Surprise Party," premiered during the Nick Jr. block on February 10, 2006. Eight episodes were made in total. A line of merchandise was also made as a partnership between American Greetings and Nickelodeon & Viacom Consumer Products. 

DVD releases for the specials were released by Paramount Home Entertainment, but later transitioned to Sony Pictures Home Entertainment.

A video game based on the series for the Nintendo DS released on October 8, 2007.

Premise
Holly Hobbie is a ten-year-old girl from a big city. She often visits her friends in a small country town called Clover. The specials feature themes like friendship, dreams, music, and aspirations.

Characters

Main 
Holly Hobbie (voiced by Alyson Stoner and Nicole Bouma) is a kind-hearted girl with long blonde hair. She likes to do cartwheels and design her own clothes. Holly and her friends are part of a secret club called the Hey Girls Club. 
Amy Morris (voiced by Liliana Mumy and Maryke Hendrikse) is a silly and imaginative girl with short brown hair. She likes to daydream and ride horses. She has her own horse named Cider.
Carrie Baker (voiced by Tinashe Kachingwe and Dorla Bell) is a smart and determined girl with dark brown hair. She is the most straight-laced and focused of the Hey Girls, and she often acts the voice of reason.
Robby Hobbie (voiced by Jansen Panettiere and Kelly Metzger) is Holly's 8-year-old little brother. He can be a little annoying and weird at times.
Kyle Morris (voiced by Paul Butcher and Kelly Metzger) is Amy's younger brother and Robby's best friend. He hangs out with Robby most of the time.
Devon (voiced by Kim Mai Guest) is a teenage girl and an honorary member of the Hey Girls Club. She works as a waitress at Aunt Jessie's Café. She wants to study the ocean in college.

Supporting 
Aunt Jessie (voiced by Rusty Schwimmer and Heather Doerksen) is Holly's aunt who runs a café. She has a cat named Bonnet.
Uncle Dave (voiced by Diedrich Bader and Brian Dobson) is Holly's uncle.
Joan Hobbie (voiced by Jane Lynch and Saffron Henderson) is Holly's mom.
Gary Hobbie (voiced by Rob Paulsen and Ian Corlett) is Holly's dad.
Bud Morris (voiced by Bill Mumy) is Amy's dad.
Teresa Morris (voiced by Molly Hagan) is Amy's mom.

Episodes

Reception
The specials received positive reviews. Regina McMenomy, a researcher at Washington State University specializing in female pop culture, praised how Holly embraces her girlishness while still being a "strong, independent" thinker. In comparison, "so many [other] newer girl characters focus on power and gender equality that they've lost their femininity," said McMenomy. Writing for The World, Jacqueline Cutler said that the show keeps the "sweet spirit" of the original Holly Hobbie brand. She also said that it would connect to its target audience: "If you're a traditional little girl and love copious amounts of sugar and everything cute, then Nickelodeon's Holly Hobbie & Friends airing Monday, Nov. 13, is for you." The Dove Foundation awarded the series its "Dove Family-Approved Seal" and wrote that "Holly Hobbie is a wonderful role model for children and adults. She has a way of brightening your day."

See also
 Holly Hobbie (TV series)

Notes

References

External links
 Holly Hobbie & Friends on Nick.com

2000s American animated television series
2000s American children's television series
2000s Nickelodeon original programming
2000s preschool education television series
2006 American television series debuts
2009 American television series endings
American children's animated television series
American preschool education television series
Animated preschool education television series
Animated television series about children
English-language television shows
Nick Jr. original programming